Joseph Chetrit is an American real estate investor and developer and founder of the Chetrit Group.

Early life
Chetrit was born to a Jewish family in Morocco  to Simon and Alice Chetrit. He has four brothers: David, Meyer, Jacob and Juda Chetrit. The Chetrit family made their initial fortune in textiles and shipping. In 1996, his father and his brother David were arrested and jailed in Morocco for smuggling and were cited as an example of injustice by the U.S. State Department in their annual human rights report. They were pardoned and released in 1998.

Career
Chetrit arrived in the United States initially tasked with furthering the family's textile business working as an importer/exporter. After pleading guilty to one felony count of violating customs laws in 1990 (and being sentenced to three years’ probation), he turned to real estate assembling a portfolio of outer-borough residential properties which he sold for $70 million in the early 1990s. In 1994, he entered into his first commercial real estate transaction, purchasing an office building on West 44th Street for $13 million. In 2002, he partnered with Brooklyn-based Simon Dushinsky's Rabsky Group to develop a portfolio of properties he purchased out of bankruptcy in Williamsburg, Brooklyn. In 2004, Chetrit was the lead investor in a group that purchased the 110-story Sears Tower in Chicago for $840 million with partners Joseph Moinian, and Israel Gluck, eventually changing the name to the Willis Tower in 2009.

Other purchases include Park West Village on the Upper West Side, the International Toy Center on Madison Square Park, 500 and 512 Seventh Ave. in the Garment District, and the Caledonian Hospital complex in Sunset Park, Brooklyn. In 2009, Chetrit purchased a portion of the real estate portfolio of prolific Brooklyn real estate developer Isaac Hager who declared bankruptcy.

In 2011, after a disagreement, the Chetrit brothers divided the family business into two entities with Joseph and Meyer operating under the Chetrit Group; and Jacob and Juda under the Chetrit Organization. Also in 2011, partnering with David Bistricer, he purchased the Chelsea Hotel for $80 million; they sold their interest in 2013.

In 2013, he and his partner David Bistricer, purchased the Sony Tower in New York City for $1.1 billion with plans to convert the building into condominiums. In 2016, they halted the project due to fears of an over-supply of luxury housing; instead selling the building for $1.4B+ to the Olayan Group of Saudi Arabia. Additional projects include the renovation of 5 Beekman Street with Charles Dayan; and the $290 million 2005 purchase along with partners Charles Dayan and Yair Levy of the 800,000 square foot historic 620 5th Avenue and its 2011 sale to RXR Realty, LLC for $500 million;

As an investor who made his primary wealth from buying low in a downturn and selling high later, Chetrit's strategy has been market timing rather than development. He typically selects structures with flexible zoning (which broadens the pool of future purchasers) in areas seeing a downturn and thanks to his minimal use of debt, he has the ability to wait the market out. At times this approach creates conflict with local businesses who want immediate change.

Personal life
Chetrit and his wife Nancy have four children,  Jonathan Chetrit, Daniel Chetrit, Samuel Chetrit and Michael Chetrit. Chetrit speaks four languages: Arabic, Hebrew, French, and English. Chetrit practices Orthodox Judaism. He lives in New York City.

References

American real estate businesspeople
Businesspeople from New York City
20th-century Moroccan Jews
Moroccan emigrants to the United States
Living people
1957 births